
Spike Island may refer to:

Australia 
 Spike Island (Tasmania)

England 
 Spike Island, Bristol, an area of the English port city of Bristol, adjoining the city centre
 Spike Island, Widnes, a park in Widnes
 Spike Island (Southampton), the area bounded by the River Itchen and River Hamble in Hampshire
 Spike Island, former name for Northumberland Heath, London
 Spike Island railway station, a workman's platform situated off the Great Northern Railway's main line south of Doncaster

Ireland 
 Spike Island, County Cork, an island in Cork Harbour, Ireland

Other
 Spike Island (concert), a 1990 concert headlined by the Stone Roses on Spike Island, Widnes
 Spike Island (film), a 2012 British film
 Spike Island Artspace, art gallery, studio complex and café